Jennifer Schuble (born July 8, 1976, in Lake Charles, Louisiana) is an American track and road cyclist.

Schuble has a diagnosis of multiple sclerosis. She works in the automotive industry for Mercedes-Benz USA.

She was a gold medalist & two-time silver medalist at the 2008 Summer Paralympics in Beijing, China and is a two-time gold medalist at Parapan American Games. She won a silver medal & bronze at the 2012 Summer Paralympics in London. Besides medals, she also is a five-time UCI World Champion and Paralympic medalist. Schuble was also a ten-time UCI World Champion and held both World record and Paralympic record for CP4 500 and 3K. She was eight-time National champion and UCI Road World Cup champion. Jennifer also holds an  American national record for C5 500, 3K, and mixed team sprint.

Recognition
In 2017, Jennifer Schuble was inducted into the U.S. Army Women's Foundation Hall of Fame.

References

1976 births
Living people
American female cyclists
Paralympic cyclists of the United States
Paralympic gold medalists for the United States
Cyclists at the 2008 Summer Paralympics
Cyclists at the 2012 Summer Paralympics
Paralympic silver medalists for the United States
Medalists at the 2008 Summer Paralympics
Medalists at the 2012 Summer Paralympics
Paralympic medalists in cycling
Medalists at the 2011 Parapan American Games
21st-century American women